Jensine Costello (born 7 May 1886) was a Norwegian painter of portraits and figure subjects who spent her career in Great Britain.

Biography
Costello was born and grew up in Norway and, after spending time in the United States, moved to England where she studied at Heatherley's School of Art in London. She painted portraits and figure subjects, usually in oils, and exhibited widely. From 1936 to 1938 Costello showed works in Paris at the Paris Salon. She also exhibited with the Royal Institute of Oil Painters, the Society of Women Artists, the National Society of Painters, Sculptors and Gravers. For a time Costello lived at Ilford in Essex and then at Exmouth in Devon.

References

1886 births
Date of death missing
19th-century Norwegian painters
19th-century Norwegian women artists
20th-century Norwegian painters
20th-century Norwegian women artists
Alumni of the Heatherley School of Fine Art
Norwegian emigrants to England
Norwegian women painters